Nicolaas "Nico" Pieter Claesen (born 1 October 1962) is a former Belgian football player who works as head coach of RFC Liège.

Career

Claesen was signed by Tottenham Hotspur in October 1986 by David Pleat who bought him from Standard Liège for £600K. He made his debut against Liverpool at Anfield. In August 1988, when Terry Venables arrived, Claesen fell out of favour and was sold for £550K to Antwerp FC. He also played for VfB Stuttgart.

International career

He earned 36 caps and scored 12 goals from 1983 to 1990 for the Belgium national football team, and was in the squad for three major tournaments: UEFA Euro 1984, the 1986 FIFA World Cup, where he scored three goals as Belgium finished in fourth, and the 1990 FIFA World Cup.

Honours

Club 
FC Antwerp

 Belgian Cup: 1991–92

International 
Belgium

 FIFA World Cup: 1986 (fourth place)

Individual 
 Belgian First Division top scorer: 1983–84 (27 goals)

References

External links
 
 

1962 births
Living people
Footballers from Limburg (Belgium)
Belgian footballers
Belgium international footballers
Belgian Pro League players
Bundesliga players
K. Patro Eisden Maasmechelen players
R.F.C. Seraing (1904) players
Tottenham Hotspur F.C. players
Royal Antwerp F.C. players
Standard Liège players
VfB Stuttgart players
UEFA Euro 1984 players
1986 FIFA World Cup players
1990 FIFA World Cup players
Expatriate footballers in England
Expatriate footballers in Germany
English Football League players
Belgian football managers
K. Patro Eisden Maasmechelen managers
K.V. Turnhout managers
K. Beringen F.C. players
People from Maasmechelen
Belgian expatriate sportspeople in Germany
Belgian expatriate sportspeople in England
Association football forwards
K. Sint-Niklase S.K.E. players
FA Cup Final players